Vasili Vasilyevich Baranov (born 5 October 1972 in Pribytki, Gomel Voblast) is a retired Belarusian professional footballer. He made his debut in the Russian Premier League in 1996 for Baltika Kaliningrad. After retiring, he has refused to give interviews.

Honours
 Russian Premier League champion: 1998, 1999, 2000, 2001.
 Russian Premier League bronze: 2002.
 Russian Cup winner: 2003.
 Russian Second Division Zone Center best midfielder: 2005.

European club competitions
 UEFA Intertoto Cup 1998 with Baltika Kaliningrad: 4 games.
 UEFA Champions League 1998–99 with Spartak Moscow : 8 games.
 UEFA Champions League 1999–2000 with Spartak Moscow: 7 games.
 UEFA Cup 1999–2000 with Spartak Moscow: 2 games.
 UEFA Champions League 2000–01 with Spartak Moscow: 7 games.
 UEFA Champions League 2001–02 with Spartak Moscow: 6 games, 1 goal.
 UEFA Champions League 2002–03 with Spartak Moscow: 2 games.

International goals
Belarus score listed first; score column indicates score after each Baranov goal.

References

1972 births
Living people
Sportspeople from Gomel
Belarusian footballers
Belarusian expatriate footballers
Belarus international footballers
FC Baltika Kaliningrad players
FC Spartak Moscow players
FC Spartak Vladikavkaz players
Russian Premier League players
Expatriate footballers in Russia
FC ZLiN Gomel players
FC Rechitsa-2014 players
Association football midfielders